Mathieu Adeniyi (born 26 April 1987 Porto-Novo) is a Beninense football player who plays for CPBB Rennes in France. His name "Adeniyi" means "The Crown is Precious" in the Yoruba language

Career 
Adeniyi began his career by Association Sportive Oussou Saka, moved in July 2005 to Stade Rennais F.C., before in November 2007 joined to La Vitréenne FC. On 10 August 2010 left La Vitréenne FC and returned to Stade Rennais F.C., who played his debut after his return on 14 August 2010 for the Reserve team against AS Moulins.

International career 
He played with U-20 from Benin U-20 at 2005 FIFA World Youth Championship in the Netherlands.

Honours 
2007: Champion de France Under 18

References

External links
 

1987 births
Beninese footballers
Beninese people of Nigerian descent
French footballers
Living people
People from Porto-Novo
Footballers from Paris
Stade Rennais F.C. players
La Vitréenne FC players
French sportspeople of Beninese descent
French people of Nigerian descent
Yoruba sportspeople
Association football midfielders
AS Oussou Saka players
Black French sportspeople